Anna Rebecca Larrucea-Pangilinan (born October 7, 1984) is a former Filipino actress. Her father is of Basque origin and her mother is a Filipino.

Career
She was launched as part of Star Circle Batch 4 and became a mainstay in ABS-CBN TV shows Ang TV (1992–1997), Kaybol (1995), Gimik (1996) and Mula sa Puso (1997).

She starred in the movie Baby Love (1995) with Jason Salcedo. She did movies such as Batang X (1995) with Aiko Melendez, Magic Temple (1996), Ang TV: The Movie (1996), Batang PX (1997) with Patrick Garcia, Mula sa Puso: The Movie (1999), Puso ng Pasko (1998), plus Sugatang Puso (2000) starring Lorna Tolentino and Christopher de Leon.

She was nominated for FAMAS Best Child Actress Award in Magic Temple (1996).

She appeared in GMA Network's TV series Hawak Ko ang Langit (2003) with Assunta de Rossi and Impostora (2007) starring Iza Calzado and Sunshine Dizon.

Filmography

Television

Film

References

External links

Living people
Filipino film actresses
Filipino people of Spanish descent
1984 births
Star Magic
Filipino people of Basque descent
Filipino television actresses
Filipino child actresses